The 2011 Stanley Cup playoffs of the National Hockey League (NHL) began on April 13, 2011, after the conclusion of the 2010–11 NHL regular season. The first game of the Finals between the Vancouver Canucks and Boston Bruins was held on June 1, and Boston went on to capture their first Stanley Cup championship since 1972 (sixth overall) in the deciding seventh game on June 15.

The Canucks made the playoffs as the Presidents' Trophy winners with the most points (i.e. best record) during the regular season. The Detroit Red Wings increased their post-season appearance streak to twenty seasons, the longest active streak at the time. This was the most recent time that the Buffalo Sabres made the playoffs; as of 2022, they hold the all-time record for longest playoff appearance drought. This was also the last time that the Florida Panthers missed the playoffs during their 10-season drought, which was previously the all-time longest drought from the tournament. For the first time in NHL history, all three California-based teams, the Los Angeles Kings, San Jose Sharks, and Anaheim Ducks, made the playoffs. San Jose went on to the Western Conference final, marking the fifth time in eight seasons that a California-based team did so.

This season marked the only time that all six division champions advanced to the second round, as the NHL has since reverted to a four-division alignment. For the first time in the history of major professional sports in North America, two different teams came back from a 3–0 deficit to tie a series, with the Chicago Blackhawks forcing game seven against the Vancouver Canucks in the first round, and the Detroit Red Wings doing the same against the San Jose Sharks in the second round (both lost). Previously, only the 1975 New York Islanders came back from two 3–0 series deficits in the same season (winning one).

By winning game seven of the Stanley Cup Finals, Boston became the first team to win three game sevens in one year, a feat that has since been matched by the 2014 Los Angeles Kings. They also became the second team in three seasons (and only the third team in NHL history) to win the Stanley Cup after losing the first two games of the Finals on the road. Vancouver remained the only team without a Stanley Cup to reach game seven of the Finals, as they also lost game seven of their previous Finals appearance in 1994.

Bruins goaltender Tim Thomas won the Conn Smythe Trophy as the most valuable player during the playoffs. Bruins forward David Krejci led all playoff scorers with 23 points in 25 games.

Playoff seeds
The top eight teams in each conference qualified for the playoffs. The top three seeds in each conference were awarded to the division winners; while the five remaining spots were awarded to the highest finishers in their respective conferences.

Eastern Conference
Washington Capitals, Southeast Division champions, Eastern Conference regular season champions – 107 points
Philadelphia Flyers, Atlantic Division champions – 106 points (44 )
Boston Bruins, Northeast Division champions – 103 points
Pittsburgh Penguins – 106 points (39 )
Tampa Bay Lightning – 103 points
Montreal Canadiens – 96 points (41 )
Buffalo Sabres – 96 points (38 )
New York Rangers – 93 points

Western Conference
Vancouver Canucks, Northwest Division champions, Western Conference regular season champions, Presidents' Trophy winners – 117 points
San Jose Sharks, Pacific Division champions – 105 points
Detroit Red Wings, Central Division champions – 104 points
Anaheim Ducks – 99 points (43 )
Nashville Predators – 99 points (38 , 4 points head-to-head vs. Phoenix, +25 goal differential)
Phoenix Coyotes – 99 points (38 , 4 points head-to-head vs. Nashville, +5 goal differential)
Los Angeles Kings – 98 points
Chicago Blackhawks – 97 points

Playoff bracket
In each round, the highest remaining seed in each conference was matched against the lowest remaining seed. The higher-seeded team was awarded home ice advantage. In the Stanley Cup Finals, home ice was awarded to the team with the better regular season record. Each best-of-seven series followed a 2–2–1–1–1 format: the higher-seeded team played at home for games one and two (plus five and seven if necessary), and the lower-seeded team was at home for games three and four (and if necessary, game six).

Conference Quarterfinals

Eastern Conference Quarterfinals

(1) Washington Capitals vs. (8) New York Rangers

The Washington Capitals entered the playoffs as the Eastern Conference regular season champions, earning 107 points. The New York Rangers qualified for the postseason as the eighth seed with 93 points. This was the sixth playoff series between the two franchises; Washington had won three of the previous five meetings between these teams. The two teams last met in the 2009 Eastern Conference Quarterfinals, in which the Capitals defeated the Rangers in seven games. In the regular season series, the Rangers held a 3–1–0 record, winning the last three games by a combined score of 15–1, although the Rangers were only able to score eight goals in this series, losing it in five games.

(2) Philadelphia Flyers vs. (7) Buffalo Sabres

The Philadelphia Flyers entered the playoffs as the second seed in the Eastern Conference after winning the Atlantic Division with 106 points, winning the tiebreaker over the Pittsburgh Penguins on regulation + overtime wins (44 to 39). The Buffalo Sabres earned the seventh seed with 96 points, losing the tiebreaker to Montreal on wins (43 to 44). This was the ninth playoff meeting between these two teams; Philadelphia had won five of the eight previous playoff series. They last met in the 2006 Eastern Conference Quarterfinals, which ended with Buffalo defeating Philadelphia in six games.

The series started out with a 1–0 shutout victory for Buffalo Sabres goaltender Ryan Miller in game one, while Philadelphia came back to win games two and three. Miller got another 1–0 shutout victory in game four to tie the series at 2–2. In game five, Buffalo was up 3–0 at the end of the first period, but Philadelphia scored three goals to send the game to overtime. However, Tyler Ennis of Buffalo would score the overtime winner. In game six, Buffalo looked in good position to win after being up 3–1 after the first period, but Philadelphia rallied back, winning the game 5–4 on Ville Leino's overtime winner. In game seven, Philadelphia went up 4–0 about two minutes into the third period on a goal by Leino. Philadelphia ended up winning the game by a score of 5–2, winning the series four games to three. This was the last time the Sabres appeared in the playoffs.

(3) Boston Bruins vs. (6) Montreal Canadiens

The Boston Bruins entered the playoffs as the third seed in the Eastern Conference after winning the Northeast Division with 103 points. The Montreal Canadiens earned the sixth seed with 96 points, winning the tiebreaker over Buffalo on wins (44 to 43). One of the greatest rivalries in North American professional sports, this was the 33rd meeting of these teams in the postseason, which is the most frequent playoff series in NHL history. Montreal had a record of 24–8 against Boston in the 32 previous series played by the franchises, winning 18 straight between 1946 and 1987. Boston had only beaten Montreal en route to winning the championship once before, in 1929. The most recent meeting of these teams in the postseason was in the 2009 Eastern Conference Quarterfinals, which ended with Boston sweeping Montreal.

During the  season, Montreal won four of six meetings. The February 9 game in which Boston won 8–6 featured six fights, a goalie fight, and a total of 187 penalty minutes. The March 8 game, where the Canadiens beat the Bruins 4–1, was marred when the Bruins' Zdeno Chara checked Habs' Max Pacioretty into the glass, and the resulting injury ended Pacioretty's season. The NHL did not suspend Chara for the hit, however Montreal Police opened a criminal investigation into the incident.

In this series, the Boston Bruins dropped their first two games at home, but came back to hang on to a game three victory in Montreal. In game four, Andrei Kostitsyn gave the Montreal Canadiens a 3–1 lead, which they couldn't take advantage of, falling 5–4 on an overtime goal by former Montreal Canadien Michael Ryder. Game five was sent into double overtime for Nathan Horton to win it 2–1 for Boston, but in game six, Montreal scored twice on 5-on-3 power plays and won it 2–1. Game seven was also forced into overtime, where Nathan Horton again won the game 4–3 and sent the Bruins to the second round of the playoffs. Boston became the first team to win a seven-game post-season series despite being held scoreless on the power play.

On April 10, the scheduled date of the French-language Canadian federal election debate between party leaders was changed from April 14 to April 13 so it would not conflict with game one of the series. Games six and seven were played back-to-back due to a Lady Gaga concert, held on April 25 at the Bell Centre, and the requirement that the first round of the playoffs end by April 27.

This was Montreal's first Game 7 loss since 1994, also against the Bruins, and their last to date.

(4) Pittsburgh Penguins vs. (5) Tampa Bay Lightning
The Pittsburgh Penguins entered the playoffs as the fourth overall seed in the Eastern Conference with 106 points, losing the tiebreaker for the Atlantic Division title to the Philadelphia Flyers on regulation + overtime wins (39 to 44). The Tampa Bay Lightning earned 103 points during the regular season to finish fifth overall in the Eastern Conference. This was the first playoff series between these two teams.

To start the series, Penguins goaltender Marc-Andre Fleury shut-out Tampa Bay 3–0 in game one, with the Lightning responding with a 5–1 win in game two. Unfortunately for the Lightning, they dropped games three and four (game four in double overtime), only to answer with a huge 8–2 victory in Pittsburgh, forcing a game six at home that ended 4–2 in favour of Tampa Bay. In game seven, Lightning forward Sean Bergenheim scored about five minutes into the second period. The Lightning managed to hold on to that 1–0 lead, advancing to the Eastern Conference Semifinals.

Western Conference Quarterfinals

(1) Vancouver Canucks vs. (8) Chicago Blackhawks

The Vancouver Canucks entered the playoffs as the Western Conference regular season champions and Presidents' Trophy winners, earning 117 points. The Chicago Blackhawks, the defending Stanley Cup champions, qualified for the post-season as the eighth seed with 97 points. This was the third consecutive year that Vancouver met Chicago in the playoffs. Chicago previously eliminated Vancouver in the second round in both 2009 and 2010; both of those series went to six games. After losing the first three games of the series, Chicago won the next three. This was the seventh time in NHL history that a team forced a seventh game after trailing 3–0 in a playoff series. However, Vancouver won the seventh game in overtime to avoid becoming the fourth team in NHL history to lose a series after taking a 3–0 series lead.

(2) San Jose Sharks vs. (7) Los Angeles Kings

The San Jose Sharks entered the playoffs as the second seed in the Western Conference after winning the Pacific Division with 105 points. The Los Angeles Kings earned the seventh seed with 98 points. This was the first meeting of these teams in the post-season.

The series started out with a bang in game one, with Dany Heatley scoring only 28 seconds into the game. That game was later on won by Joe Pavelski in overtime, but a good response by the Kings in game two gave them a 4–0 shutout victory in San Jose. In game three, San Jose became the fifth team in NHL playoff history to win a game after facing a 4–0 deficit, where Devin Setoguchi of San Jose scored the game-winning goal in overtime, to make the final score 6–5. Still, at home, Los Angeles lost game four by a score of 6–3. In game five, at San Jose, Los Angeles would win by a score of 3–1. However, that would not be enough, as Joe Thornton of San Jose scored the game-winning goal in overtime of game six to eliminate Los Angeles from the playoffs.

(3) Detroit Red Wings vs. (6) Phoenix Coyotes

The Detroit Red Wings entered the playoffs as the third seed in the Western Conference after winning the Central Division with 104 points. This was Detroit's 20th straight appearance in the postseason. The Phoenix Coyotes earned the sixth seed with 99 points, losing tiebreakers over the Anaheim Ducks and the Nashville Predators in total regulation + overtime wins (43 to 38). They also lost the tiebreaker to Nashville on goal differential (+25 to +5). This was a rematch of the previous year's Western Conference Quarterfinals, in which Detroit defeated Phoenix in seven games.

The Red Wings had 13 different goal scorers in the series. This was the only sweep in the first round of the playoffs.

(4) Anaheim Ducks vs. (5) Nashville Predators

The Anaheim Ducks entered the playoffs as the fourth overall seed in the Western Conference with 99 points, winning tiebreakers over the Nashville Predators and the Phoenix Coyotes in total regulation + overtime wins (43 to 38). The Nashville Predators also earned 99 points during the regular season to finish fifth overall. They lost the tiebreaker to Anaheim by having fewer games won in regulation + overtime (43 to 38) while winning the tiebreaker over the Phoenix Coyotes in goal differential (+25 to +5). This was the first playoff series between these two teams. Nick Spaling's second goal of the game early in the third period of Game 6 gave the Predators the lead and they held on to win the game 4–2. This was Nashville's first playoff series victory in franchise history since entering the league in 1998.

Conference Semifinals

Eastern Conference Semifinals

(1) Washington Capitals vs. (5) Tampa Bay Lightning

This was the second playoff series between these two teams. Washington and Tampa Bay previously met in the 2003 Eastern Conference Quarterfinals, where Tampa Bay defeated Washington in six games. In the six-game regular season series between these teams, Washington won four games (including one win in a shootout). In game one, Sean Bergenheim, the player with the winning goal in game seven against Pittsburgh, opened the scoring for Tampa Bay, but goals from Alexander Semin and Eric Fehr put Washington up 2–1, only for Tampa Bay to regain the lead and win with Steven Stamkos' late second period power play goal. Late in game two, Tampa Bay was up 2–1, when Alexander Ovechkin received a pass from behind the net to tie the game at two, but in overtime, Tampa Bay forward Vincent Lecavalier put in his second goal of the game to win it for Tampa Bay. Game three was a hard-fought game for Washington, after being up 3–2 to start the third period. However, Washington would ultimately lose game three by a score of 4–3. Washington would then lose game four by a score of 5–3, to fall to Tampa Bay in a 4–0 series sweep.

(2) Philadelphia Flyers vs. (3) Boston Bruins

This was the sixth playoff series between these two teams. It was a rematch of the previous year's Eastern Conference Semifinals, in which Philadelphia came back from a 3–0 deficit to beat Boston in seven games. Boston swept Philadelphia out of the playoffs, avenging their blown 3–0 lead to move on to the Eastern Conference Final for the first time since 1992. This series featured some goaltending trouble for Philadelphia; Boston outscored Philadelphia 20–7 in four games. Brian Boucher started the first three games, but was pulled in all three: he was removed from games one and three due to performance, and he was briefly removed from game two due to injury. In all, Philadelphia started three different goaltenders in the 11 games that they played in the 2011 playoffs; six of those games featured a change of goalie.

Western Conference Semifinals

(1) Vancouver Canucks vs. (5) Nashville Predators

This was the first playoff series between these two teams. It was also the first time that the Nashville Predators played in the second round of the playoffs. Vancouver and Nashville had split the four-game regular season series between them. Vancouver won this series in six games to advance to the Conference Finals for the first time since 1994. Each game in this series was decided by just a single goal (with the exception of an empty net goal scored by Vancouver in game four).

(2) San Jose Sharks vs. (3) Detroit Red Wings

This was the fifth playoff series between these two teams. This was a rematch of the previous year's Western Conference Semifinals, in which San Jose defeated Detroit in five games. After losing the first three games, Detroit won the next three, to force a seventh game. This was the eighth time this feat had been achieved in NHL history, the third time in the last two seasons, the second time in the 2011 playoffs, and the second time that the Red Wings had accomplished the feat. Chicago had accomplished the same feat against Vancouver in the Conference Quarterfinals, ultimately losing that series. Since the New York Islanders twice forced a game seven after being down 3–0 during the 1975 Stanley Cup playoffs, there had been 112 consecutive failed attempts to repeat that feat prior to the 2010 Stanley Cup playoffs, after which it has happened in three of the seven possible series. San Jose won the seventh game by a score of 3–2 to avoid becoming the fourth team in NHL history to lose a series after taking a 3–0 series lead. It allowed them their second consecutive trip to the Conference Finals. Six of the games were decided by only one goal; the only exception was a 3–1 win by Detroit in game six, in which Darren Helm of Detroit scored an empty net goal.

Conference Finals

Eastern Conference Final

(3) Boston Bruins vs. (5) Tampa Bay Lightning

This was the first playoff series between these teams. Boston won three of the four games that were played in the regular season. Bruins rookie Tyler Seguin scored a goal and an assist in his first career playoff game in game one. In game two, he tied the NHL record for points by a teenager in a single playoff period with four points, two goals and two assists (held by Trevor Linden). Game seven featured remarkable discipline from both teams, as no penalties were called during the game, the first time this had happened in the playoffs in over twenty years. Boston's Nathan Horton recorded his second game-seven-winning goal in this year's playoffs, as his first was scored against Montreal in round one.

Western Conference Final

(1) Vancouver Canucks vs. (2) San Jose Sharks

This was the first playoff series between these teams. Vancouver won three of the four games that were played in the regular season; their only loss to San Jose came in a shootout. Both Vancouver and San Jose played in a series during the 2011 playoffs (Quarterfinals and Semifinals, respectively) where each took a 3–0 series lead, only to see the opposing team win the next three games to force a seventh game. However, both won their respective seventh games to advance to the next round of the playoffs. San Jose, facing elimination in game five, held a 2–1 lead near the end of the game until Ryan Kesler forced overtime by scoring with only 13.2 seconds left in the third period after a controversial icing call. After a scoreless first overtime, Kevin Bieksa was able to capitalize on an unexpected rebound to score the series-winning goal 10:18 into the second overtime, sending Vancouver to the Stanley Cup Final for the first time since 1994. The Canucks had previously won the Western Conference Final on May 24, 1994, 17 years to the day before this year's Conference Final win. Both games went to double overtime.

Stanley Cup Finals

As the Presidents' Trophy winners, the Vancouver Canucks earned home ice advantage over the Boston Bruins in the Finals. This was the first playoff series between Vancouver and Boston. Vancouver and Boston met only once in the 2010–11 regular season, on February 26. Boston won that game by a score of 3–1. This was Vancouver's third appearance in the Stanley Cup Finals; in both of their previous appearances, they lost to a team from New York. In 1982, they were swept by the Islanders. In 1994, they lost to the Rangers in seven games. This was Boston's first appearance in the Finals since their five-game loss to the Edmonton Oilers in 1990. Boston last won the Stanley Cup in 1972, when they defeated the New York Rangers in six games.

In a back-and-forth series, the Bruins triumphed in seven games. This series saw the home team won the first six games, as the Canucks and Bruins each won three home games. All three Vancouver wins were close affairs at Rogers Arena: two 1–0 wins in games one and five, and a 3–2 overtime victory in game two. In Boston at the TD Garden, the Bruins buried the Canucks in an avalanche of goals, winning games three, four, and six by scores of 8–1, 4–0 and 5–2, respectively. In the deciding game 7, the Bruins defeated the Canucks 4–0 at Rogers Arena.

Player statistics

Skaters
These are the top ten skaters based on points. If the list exceeds ten skaters because of a tie in points, goals take precedence, and all the tied skaters are shown.

GP = Games played; G = Goals; A = Assists; Pts = Points; +/– = Plus/minus

Goaltending
This is a combined table of the top five goaltenders based on goals against average and the top five goaltenders based on save percentage, with at least 420 minutes played. The table is sorted by GAA, and the criteria for inclusion are bolded.

GP = Games played; W = Wins; L = Losses; SA = Shots against; GA = Goals against; GAA = Goals against average; SV% = Save percentage; SO = Shutouts; TOI = Time on ice (minutes:seconds)

Television
National Canadian English-language coverage of the first three rounds of the playoffs were split between CBC and TSN. CBC held exclusive rights to the Stanley Cup Finals. French-language telecasts were broadcast on RDS and RDS2.

In the United States, national coverage was split between NBC and Versus, with NBC also airing the first two and final three games of the Stanley Cup Finals, while Versus broadcast games three and four. This was the last postseason that only selected first and second-round games were nationally televised, as well as the last postseason American regional sports networks carrying both their teams' first- and second-round games. After Comcast, the owners of Versus, completing its acquisition of a majority stake in NBC Universal, the combined company signed a new TV contract in April 2011. Among the new changes for 2012, all playoff games will air nationally for the first time on either NBC or one of NBC Universal's cable channels, and the regional sports networks will be limited to only airing first-round games.

References

External links
2011 Stanley Cup playoffs at ESPN

Playoffs, 2011
Stanley Cup playoffs

sv:National Hockey League 2010/2011#Slutspelet